Nucleic acid methods are the techniques used to study nucleic acids: DNA and RNA.

Purification
DNA extraction
Phenol–chloroform extraction
Minicolumn purification
RNA extraction
Boom method
Synchronous coefficient of drag alteration (SCODA) DNA purification

Quantification
Abundance in weight: spectroscopic nucleic acid quantitation
Absolute abundance in number: real-time polymerase chain reaction (quantitative PCR)
High-throughput relative abundance: DNA microarray
High-throughput absolute abundance: serial analysis of gene expression (SAGE)
Size: gel electrophoresis

Synthesis
De novo: oligonucleotide synthesis
Amplification: polymerase chain reaction (PCR)

Kinetics
Multi-parametric surface plasmon resonance
Dual-polarization interferometry
Quartz crystal microbalance with dissipation monitoring (QCM-D)

Gene function
RNA interference

Other
Bisulfite sequencing
DNA sequencing
Expression cloning
Fluorescence in situ hybridization
Lab-on-a-chip
Comparison of nucleic acid simulation software
Northern blot
Nuclear run-on assay
Radioactivity in the life sciences
Southern blot
Differential centrifugation (sucrose gradient)
Toeprinting assay
Several bioinformatics methods, as seen in list of RNA structure prediction software

See also
CSH Protocols
Current Protocols

References

External links
Protocols for Recombinant DNA Isolation, Cloning, and Sequencing

Genetics techniques
Molecular biology
Nucleic acids